Mechanical Royalty is a limited edition EP released by the Canadian musician Spookey Ruben in 2008. A full length LP was released with the help of Sonic Unyon in 2009. Though the track-listing differs between the LP and the EP, all but one song from the EP remain ("Eyes Can See").  The album is described as a 'concept album about a kingdom of robots who are attacked by the humans who originally created them because they possess a magnetic force that keeps harmony in society that the humans want back for themselves.'

Track listing (LP) 
 "Cat & Mouse" - 1:52
 "Rachel" - 2:56
 "Just Another Way" - 3:08
 "If You Don't Wanna Know" - 3:25
 "U Don't Know What You're Missing" - 3:15
 "American Processed Cheese" - 2:21
 "Eyes Of Man" - 4:18
 "Mechanical Royalty" - 15:21
 Agent Steel
 Attack at Krankshaft Castle
 And Thus He Rusts (King's Lament)
 The Quirks of Queen of Quartz and Quarks
 Don Silicon
 Secrets in the Motherboard
 Triumph on Magnetic Hill 
 "Superpoke" - 4:29
 "Testimony" - 4:25

Review 

The music site sceneandheard.ca gave the Mechanical Royalty EP a favorable review, stating, "The overall feel of the album is, as always, techno (blips dot the album as do other computerized treatments), with a distinct retro feel that may be off-putting to some. But if you give it a chance (three or four solid spins) you start to appreciate the crafty tune-smithing and zany approach to music Spooky [sic] is known for during his decade-plus career"

A review by Antimusic states, "Mechanical Royalty (a pun, alluding not only to the album cover and storyline of the title track, but also to a music business term) is an intense 70s/80s rollercoaster ride, but its Spookey's point of view that makes it feel inviting and brand new, consistently dishing up his excitement for music in his own special heartfelt way."

Production 
 Written and Produced by Spookey Ruben
 Co-produced by Carson Cohen, Gene Hughes, Chris Fudurich & Ed Krautner

References

External links 
 Hi-Hat's Website

2008 albums
Spookey Ruben albums